Andrew Drummond (born 1951 in Nelson, New Zealand) is a New Zealand painter and sculptor. He attended University of Waterloo in Canada, graduating in 1976.  He was a Frances Hodgkins Fellow in 1980.

Information
Andrew Drummond tends to focus on process and ritual while contemplating ideas of location. He considers the entanglements of the human body, ecology, and dislocated histories within the landscapes of New Zealand. In the 1970s, he created several documented performance works. Drummond lives and works in Christchurch, New Zealand. He earned his degree in Fine Arts from the University of Waterloo, Canada, and is currently a senior lecturer in sculpture at the University of Canterbury, School of Fine Arts. He is represented by Jonathan Smart gallery in Christchurch, Page Blackie gallery in Wellington and Antoinette Godkin gallery in Auckland.

Honours and awards 
In 2007 Drummond was awarded the New Zealand Order of Merit for services to sculpture

Andrew Drummond has received the following awards:
1999 Creative New Zealand Grant for Projects Environment commission
1995 Creative New Zealand Grant for Robert McDougall Art Gallery commission
1990 Australia, New Zealand Foundation Fellowship
1987 Tylee Cottage Residency
1981 Major Grant, QEII Arts Council
1980 Frances Hodgkins Fellowship, University of Otago, Dunedin

Works
Andrew Drummond works with a variety of media and materials. His work includes process-based installation, photography, figurative and symbolic imagery.

He had an exhibition at the Wellington City Gallery in 1981 titled Andrew Drummond: Works 80.

Public sculpture and commissions 
Drummond has received many commissions for both private and public sculptures.
 2016/17 Ramarama, Suter Gallery, Nelson
 2014/15 Armillary for Air, private commission, Ohinetahi, Governors Bay, Canterbury
 2011/12 Rotating Sphere, private commission, South Canterbury, NZ
 2007 Vertical Form, Counter Rotating, private commission, Nelson
 2006 Vertical Form, Counter Rotating, private commission, Banks Peninsula

 2005 Tower of Light, Wellington Sculpture Trust commission for Meridian Energy Wind Project
 2004 Cascade, commission for Woollaston Estates, Nelson
 2004 for Swinging and Spinning, private commission, Geraldine, Canterbury
2000 Assignation Device, commission by Kiwi Properties for Veto Building, Auckland
1999 Crossroads, commission by Projects Environment for ArtBarns: After Kurt Schwitters
1995 for Beating and Breathing, commission for Robert McDougall Art Gallery, Christchurch
1994 Device for Listening & Viewing, Wellington Sculpture Trust commission, Botanic Garden, Wellington
1990 Stationary Limbs, commission for the Fletcher Trust Collection, Fletcher Challenge House, Auckland

Controversy 
As part of the Canterbury Society of Arts 1978 festival Platforms Drummond performed Crucifixion. He was fixed to a diagonally shaped cross while a latex skin was created on his naked body, once formed the skin was shed from his body and he left the stage. Drummond wore a gas mask throughout to protect himself from the ammonia generated by the drying latex, he was also connected to an ECG machine so observers could monitor his emotional state.  For the duration of the festival the discarded latex skin was laid out on the cross and exhibited with Polaroid photographs taken during the performance plus other detritus from the performance.

Two people in the audience took offence at the nudity and reported the performance to the police. The police laid charges (under Section 3(d) of the Police Offences Act.), when eventually heard in court the behaviour was found to be 'ill-mannered, in bad taste, crude and offensive', but the charges were dismissed.

See also
 List of University of Waterloo people

References

External links
Profile from the New Zealand Listener, 29 July – 4 August 2006 Vol 204 No 3455
Andrew Drummond – TePapa's website 
Jonathan Smart gallery – solo show in 2013 

New Zealand painters
Living people
Academic staff of the University of Canterbury
University of Waterloo alumni
People associated with the Museum of New Zealand Te Papa Tongarewa
20th-century New Zealand sculptors
20th-century New Zealand male artists
21st-century New Zealand sculptors
21st-century New Zealand male artists
1951 births